Sorø Academy (Danish, Sorø Akademi) is a boarding school and gymnasium located in the small town of Sorø, Denmark. It traces its history back to the 12th century when Bishop Absalon founded a monastery at the site, which was confiscated by the Crown after the Reformation, and ever since, on and off, it has served as an educational institution, in a variety of forms, including as a knight academy founded by Christian IV and a venue for higher learning during the Danish Golden Age. Danish writer and academian Ludvig Holberg bequested most of his fortune to re-establishing the academy in 1750 after a devastating fire.

History

Christian IV's equestrian academy (1623–1665)
 

Sorø Academy traces its history back to 1140 when Archbishop Absalon founded the  Cistercian Sorø Abbey in a remote woodlands setting on the shores of Lake Sorø on the island of Zealand. It developed into the most prominent and wealthy monastery in Denmark. After the Reformation in 1536, the Crown confiscated the Catholic Church's properties and the former abbey served first as an educational institution for Protestant priests before Frederick II turned it into a boarding school for an equal number of noble and commoner boys.

Sorø Academy was founded in 1623 when Christian IV turned the boarding school into an Equestrian Academy. Later attempts were made to transform it into a university proper but it only existed as such for about 20 years before closing in 1665.

Second academy: The Holberg era  (1747–1793)

After the closure the premises continued as a school until 1737. Efforts were made to reestablish the academy and around 1740, under the reign of Christian VI, the old buildings were rebuilt by Lauritz de Thurah, yet the plans did not materialize until Ludvig Holberg, who had no heirs, was persuaded to bequest his considerable fortune to the institution. The agreement which was ultimately settled upon exempted Holberg from paying taxes from the proceeds of his lands and to reach this end he was ennobled with title of Baron.

Holberg was also consulted on the organization of the academy and the appointment of professors. Jens Schielderup Sneedorff was appointed professor in political sciences on his recommendation in 1751.

Golden Age venue

 
The main wing burnt down in a fire in 1813 but was rebuilt from 1822 to 1827 to the design of Peder Malling. In 1825, before the rebuilding had been completed, the Sorø Academy reopened once again. Over the next decades it became a central venue of the Danish Golden Age with Bernhard Severin Ingemann as a central figure. Both N. F. S. Grundtvig, Hans Christian Andersen and Bertel Thorvaldsen visited the Academy during this period.

Buildings

Main wing and gardens
The current main wing is designed by Peder Malling in a Neoclassical style which relies more on Greek than Roman architecture for its inspiration. It interior has decorative works by Georg Hilker.

The Academy is surrounded by an English-style park known as the Academy Garden. Located in the park is the Vænget building which contains Adam Wilhelm Hauch's Physical Cabinet, one of the largest collections of scientific instruments in Europe.

Chapel
The conventual church is an example of Cistercian craftsmanship. It is the third longest church in Denmark, and is one of the first Danish churches built of brick. The Reformation whitewashed the traditional decorations of the church; recently the ancient murals have been uncovered and in part restored.  Holberg is buried in the church, as are King Valdemar Atterdag (1340–1375) and his father King Christopher II (1276–1332).

Other buildings
The gatehouse is the oldest inhabited building in Denmark today.  It is where Saxo Grammaticus wrote the famous chronicles 'Gesta Danorum', a medieval historical work recounting the early Christian history of Scandinavia.

Two former professor's residences, today known as Molbech's House and Ingemann's House, survived the fire in 1813 and date from Lauritz de Thurah's rebuilding of the Academy in 1740.

The old well, stemming from the original abbey, was in 1915 topped by a well house designed by Martin Nyrop, one of the schools former students.

Other buildings are the Rector's House, the Alumnatet and the Library Building.

Sorø Academy today

The school
The current school has 630 students, of which 140 are boarders and the rest day students from Sorø, Ringsted and the surrounding countryside.

Collections
The library has a large collection of old and rare books.

Wilhelm Hauch's physical Physical Cabinet, one of the largest collections of scientific instruments in Europe.

Sorø Academy Foundation
Sorø Academy Foundation (Stiftelsen Sorø Akademi) owns approximately 6000 hectares of land, mainly covered by forest. The foundation also owns a number of properties in the town of Sorø including Sorø Klosterkirke.

Notable people

Former staff
 Reinhold Timm (1623), painter
 Abraham Wuchters (1639), painter
 Johann Elias Schlegel (1748-1749), history, political sciences, trade sciences
 Jens Schielderup Sneedorff (1751), political sciences
 Johann Bernhard Basedow (1753), moral philosophy
 Ove Høegh-Guldberg (1761–1764), statesman, historian, and de facto prime minister
 Johan Theodor Holmskjold (1762–1765), medicine and natural history
 Bernhard Severin Ingemann (1822), Danish literature
 Frederik Johnstrup (1818–1894), mineralogy, natural science
 Christen Dalsgaard (1862–1892), painter
Aage Blumensaadt (1889-1939), painter

Former students
 Ulrik of Denmark (1611–1633), administrator of the Prince-Bishopric of Schwerin, military
 Esaias Fleischer  (1633–1697), printmaker

Students after 1825
 Hinrich Johannes Rink, geologist
 Frederik Vermehren, painter
 Carl Steen Andersen Bille, journalist, politician and civil servant
 Fredrik Bajer (student 1848-54, did not graduate)
 H.R. Hiort-Lorenzen, journalist and writer
 Christian Henrik Arendrup, governor of the Danish West Indies
 Martin Nyrop (attended 1859–1865), architect
 Kristian Zahrtmann, painter
 Hans Egede Budtz, actor
 Herman Bang, writer
 Poul Rasmusen, politician
 Sigurd Langberg, actor
 Ebbe Hamerik, composer
 Hans Kirk, writer
 Jørgen-Frantz Jacobsen, writer
 Aage Kann Rasmussen, engineer
 Ove Arup, structural engineer
 Erik Seidenfaden, journalist
 Gunnar Seidenfaden, diplomat and botanist,
 Mogens Boisen, officer and translator
 Dan Fink, businessman
 Villum Kann Rasmussen, engineer
 Hans Engell, journalist, politician
 Hans Ole Thers, composer
 Christian Karsten Hansen, biotechnology entrepreneur
 Trygvi Samuelsen, lawyer

Other Danes associated with the Academy include 19th-century painters Frederik Vermehren and Christen Dalsgaard, writer Hans Christian Andersen, sculptor Johannes Wiedewelt who created the monument to Holberg in the Academy chapel, and geologist Hinrich Johannes Rink.

See also
 Sorø Lake
 Sorø Old Cemetery
 Mørup

References

External links
Sorø Akademi website
Stiftelsen Sorø Akademi website
 Sorø Church and Academy, with many pictures

Gymnasiums in Denmark
Listed buildings and structures in Sorø Municipality
1625 establishments in Denmark
Tourist attractions in Sorø Municipality
Ludvig Holberg